Angelo Persia (born 2 June 1998) is an Italian professional footballer who plays as a midfielder for  club Piacenza.

Career
Born in Avezzano, Persia joined to Roma youth sector at 12 years old. He has a young career with many injuries. As a senior, he played three seasons wih Avezzano on Serie D.

In July 2018, he signed with Serie C club Teramo. He made his professional debut on 26 September against Imolese.

On 5 September 2019, he joined to Fermana. On 28 January 2021, he left the club by mutual consent.

In February 2021, he moved to Campobasso, but due to injury he suspended his contract with the club for the rest of the season. For the next season, on 19 October 2021 he returned to Campobasso.

On 30 September 2022, Persia signed with Piacenza.

References

External links
 
 

1998 births
Living people
People from Avezzano
Footballers from Abruzzo
Sportspeople from the Province of L'Aquila
Italian footballers
Association football midfielders
Serie C players
Serie D players
Avezzano Calcio players
A.S. Roma players
S.S. Teramo Calcio players
Fermana F.C. players
S.S.D. Città di Campobasso players
Piacenza Calcio 1919 players